Melissa Castrillón Gómez (born 1995) is a Colombian chess player who holds the title of Woman International Master. She has represented Colombia at three Chess Olympiads.

Biography
In 2009, in Mar del Plata, Castrillón won Pan American Girls' Chess Championship in the under 14 age group. In 2011, in La Ceja she won South American Zonal Women's Chess Championship and was given the right to participate in Women's World Chess Championship. In 2012, in Khanty-Mansiysk, Castrillón made her debut in the Women's World Chess Championship, where in the first round she lost to Nadezhda Kosintseva.

She has played for Colombia at four Chess Olympiads (2012—2018) and won individual silver (2012) medal.

Castrillón was awarded the Woman FIDE Master (WFM) in 2009, and as a result of her performance in the 2011 South American Zonal Women's Chess Championship she was awarded the Woman International Master (WIM) title in 2012.

She won the Women's section of the Colombian Chess Championship in 2020.

References

External links
 
 
 

1995 births
Living people
Colombian female chess players
Chess Woman International Masters
Chess Olympiad competitors
21st-century Colombian women